"Safe & Sound" is a song by American singer-songwriter Taylor Swift featuring American duo the Civil Wars, taken from The Hunger Games: Songs from District 12 and Beyond, the official soundtrack to the 2012 film The Hunger Games. Swift and the Civil Wars wrote the track with its producer, T-Bone Burnett, at his house within two hours. A sparse folk ballad, "Safe & Sound" has lyrics about the Hunger Games protagonist Katniss Everdeen's empathy and compassion for other characters, realizing she soon has to enter "the hunger games". Swift sings lead vocals with a high-pitched vibrato, and the Civil Wars provide harmony vocals.

The song was released for digital download via the iTunes Store on December 26, 2011, by Big Machine Records. A music video for "Safe & Sound", directed by Philip Andelman and filmed in Watertown, Tennessee, was released on February 13, 2012. Critical reception of the song was generally positive; critics described the production as haunting and eerie. "Safe & Sound" won Best Song Written for Visual Media at the 55th Annual Grammy Awards in 2013. It peaked at number 30 on the Billboard Hot 100 and was certified double platinum by the Recording Industry Association of America.

A re-recording of the song, titled "Safe & Sound (Taylor's Version)", was released on March 17, 2023, via Republic Records. The re-recording is part of Swift's plan to re-record her back catalog, following the dispute over the ownership of the masters of her first six albums.

Background

T Bone Burnett produced The Hunger Games: Songs from District 12 and Beyond, the soundtrack to the 2012 film The Hunger Games. He recruited other artists to write and record songs for the soundtrack, including Taylor Swift and folk duo the Civil Wars. While on a Los Angeles concert in fall 2011, the Civil Wars were invited to Burnett's house; there, they and Swift together wrote "Safe & Sound" during a two-hour session. Swift had spent two days reading the book to understand the story; the song is told from Katniss Everdeen's perspective. For Swift, who had mostly written autobiographical songs inspired by her personal life, writing from a fictional character's viewpoint was refreshing for her. The Civil Wars' Joy Williams described the session with Swift and Burnett "an amazingly soulful, organic, productive time".

On December 22, 2011, Swift posted a portion of the song's lyrics via her Twitter account and said that "Something I've been [very] excited about for a [very] long time is going to be happening very soon." Four days later, the song was released digitally on iTunes Store, through Big Machine Records.

Composition and lyrics
Lionsgate, the producer of The Hunger Games, wanted Burnett to create music that evokes "what Appalachian music would sound like in 300 years". To this extent, "Safe & Sound" features an Appalachian-music-inspired production, congruent with the story's setting in the Appalachian region. Billboard described it as a folk ballad, with Jason Lipsthutz commenting that it evokes a melancholy atmosphere. Rolling Stone journalist Monica Herrera found the production reminiscent of alternative country. In American Songwriter, Evan Schlansky deemed the track "a swelling melody, and is built around an escalating run of notes". Swift described Burnett's production as "a lullaby". Written in the key of G major, the track has a tempo of 72 beats per minute. It features Swift on lead vocals, singing with a high-pitched vibrato, and the Civil Wars on harmony vocals. Swift's vocals span from G3 to D5. In hindsight, critics commented that the song's folksy production laid the groundwork to the sound of Swift's 2020 albums, Folklore and Evermore.

The lyrics, according to Swift, are about The Hunger Games protagonist Katniss's empathy and compassion for other characters in different parts of the story. She said of the novel, "I thought it would be an action-adventure type of thing, but it's so much more emotional than that. There's a huge amount of sadness." According to the film's marketing executive, "Safe & Sound" pinpoints the moment when Katniss realizes her sister Rue has fallen into danger and comes to term to prepare with the upcoming "hunger games" in which she has to participate. The narrator tells her loved ones to hide away from "the war outside our door keeps raging on". She grows protective of her loved ones, "Hold on to this lullaby even when the music’s gone." Christopher John Farley from The Wall Street Journal found the lyrics soothing yet subtly hurtful and dreadful, "Just close your eyes/ The sun is going down/ You'll be alright/ No one can hurt you now." Slant Magazine's Jonathan Keefe said the lyrics suggest the narrator's promise of a better tomorrow, but the dropping of the instruments in the hook give the otherwise impression that the narrator does not believe it herself.

Critical reception
Jody Rosen from Rolling Stone gave the song four out of five stars, calling it Swift's "prettiest ballad." In a review of The Hunger Games: Songs from District 12 and Beyond, AllMusic's Heather Phares picked it as one of the highlights on the soundtrack, calling it "the most crucial" track. Idolator praised Swift's "breathiness that sounds more eerie than sweet", while Jason Lipshutz writing for Billboard commended the "non-Swiftian anthem that embraces the folksiness of the soundtrack" and favored the guest appearance contributed by the Civil Wars. In a less favorable feedback, Darren Franich, and editor from Entertainment Weekly, was not impressed towards the track's lyrics and Swift's vocals, writing that "there's no sense of triumph". He further added that "Safe & Sound" "sounds more like a funeral dirge than a victory chant, especially as the song continues with light percussion that sounds like soldiers marching to their doom." In Spin, Marc Hogan said that despite a disappointing first listen, he found Swift's vocals to be "terrifically gorgeous" later on. Reviewing the soundtrack for Slant Magazine, Jonathan Keefe praised Burnett's production for bringing a "real sense of gravity". In a 2019 review, Idolator's Mike Wass wrote: "With sparse, eerie production, 'Safe & Sound' is one of the Swift's most beguiling singles. Her breathy vocals have never been better utilized & the menacing lyrics are a testament to her songwriting versatility. It should've been bigger". In June 2022, Insider ranked "Safe & Sound" as Swift's best soundtrack song.

At the 2012 Country Music Association Awards, "Safe & Sound" was nominated for Musical Event of the Year. It also garnered a CMT Music Award nomination for Collaborative of the Year in that year. The song was nominated for Best Original Song at the 70th Golden Globe Awards in 2013, but lost to Adele's "Skyfall". At the 2013 Grammy Awards, "Safe & Sound" received a nomination for Best Country Duo/Group Performance, but lost to "Pontoon" by Little Big Town, and won the Best Song Written for Visual Media.

Chart performance
During the first week of release, "Safe & Sound" entered the Billboard Hot Digital Songs at number 19 with 136,000 digital units sold. On the Billboard Hot 100, the single debuted and peaked at number 30. Following the release of the song's music video, it re-entered the Hot 100 at number 56. In its eleventh week on chart, the song rose number 71 to number 35, prior to the release of The Hunger Games soundtrack. The track was certified double platinum by the Recording Industry Association of America (RIAA). As of November 2017, the song has sold 1.9 million copies in the United States.

The track also peaked at number 31 on the Canadian Hot 100 chart. Internationally, "Safe & Sound" attained moderate commercial success. The single peaked at number 38 on the Australian ARIA Singles Chart and stayed on the chart for three weeks. It was more successful in New Zealand, peaking at number 11 on the New Zealand Singles Chart and remained for five weeks. "Safe & Sound" also charted on the UK Singles Chart at number 67.

Music video
The song's music video, which is directed by Philip Andelman, premiered on February 13, 2012, at 7:54 p.m. ET on MTV. Parts of the music video were shot in a cemetery, including a scene of Swift sitting atop the graves of a couple who died in 1853. The video features Swift, walking barefoot through a forest in Watertown, Tennessee, wearing a long white gown. Between scenes, the Civil Wars are seen inside a cottage house sitting in front of a fireplace as they sing along to the song. It contains multiple references to The Hunger Games, including Swift finding a mockingjay pin.

Awards and nominations

Live performances
During the Australian leg of the Speak Now World Tour, Swift added "Safe & Sound" to the tour's setlist. Swift performed the track while sitting on a couch onstage, wearing a "sparkling, floor-length gown", which, according to Brittany Cooper of Taste of Country, was slightly reminiscent of Belle from Disney's Beauty and the Beast (1991). Cooper provided a positive feedback to the performance, writing that "[Swift] took the song with a whimsical air and gave it all the mystique you would expect from the haunting ballad."

Charts

Certifications

"Safe & Sound (Taylor's Version)"

A re-recorded version of "Safe & Sound", titled "Safe & Sound (Taylor's Version)", was released by Swift on March 17, 2023, via Republic Records. The song is part of Swift's re-recording plan following the dispute over the ownership of the masters of her older discography.

Release history

References

Taylor Swift songs
The Hunger Games music
2011 songs
2011 singles
Songs written by Taylor Swift
Songs written by John Paul White
Songs written by T Bone Burnett
Song recordings produced by Taylor Swift
Song recordings produced by T Bone Burnett
Song recordings produced by Chris Rowe
The Civil Wars songs
Grammy Award for Best Song Written for Visual Media
Music videos directed by Philip Andelman
2010s ballads
American folk songs
Alternative country songs
Country ballads
Folk ballads